Bayamo is the capital city of the Granma Province of Cuba and one of the largest cities in the Oriente region.

Overview
The community of Bayamo lies on a plain by the Bayamo River. It is affected by the violent Bayamo wind.

One of the most important education institutions in the province is the University of Granma.

History
Established in 1513, Bayamo was the third of seven cities founded by Diego Velázquez de Cuéllar. Francisco Iznaga, a Basque landowner in the western portion of Cuba during the first 30 years of the colonization of Cuba, was elected mayor in 1540. Iznaga was the originator of a powerful lineage that finally settled in Trinidad, where the Torre Iznaga (Iznaga Tower) is. His descendants fought for the independence of Cuba and for annexation to the U.S., from 1820 to 1900.

During much of the 16th century it was one of the most important agricultural and commercial settlements of the island. Its inland situation gave it relative security against the pirates who infested West Indian seas, and the misfortunes of Santiago were the fortunes of Bayamo. Down the Cauto River, then open to the sea for vessels of 200 tons, and through Manzanillo, Bayamo drove a thriving contraband trade that made it the leading town of Cuba at the opening of the 17th century.

A tremendous flood, in 1616, choked the Cauto with trees and wrecked vessels, cutting it off from direct access to the sea; but through Manzanillo it continued a great clandestine traffic with Curaçao, Jamaica, and other foreign islands throughout the 17th and 18th centuries. Bayamo was then surrounded by fine plantations.

In 1827 it acquired the status of city. In the war of 1868–1878 it was an insurgent stronghold. One of the most desperate conflicts of the war was fought nearby, and it was nearly destroyed by the opposing parties.

Demographics
In 2004, the municipality of Bayamo had a population of 222,118.

Transportation
Bayamo is an under-recognized world leader in sustainable transportation. Per a UN study only about 15% of commuters rely on motorized transport and almost three times as many (39%) rely on about 500 licensed horse-drawn carriages generally following fixed routes. The rest of the non-pedestrian traffic is bicycle and bicycle taxi.

Carlos Manuel de Céspedes Airport satisfies the city's commercial aviation needs; it has had service to Havana on Cubana Airlines.

Notable residents
Francisco Vicente Aguilera (1821–1877), revolutionary
Ricardo Villaverde (1908–1999), surgeon and businessman 
Conrado Roblejo Aguilera (born 1966), doctor
José Antonio Cedeño (born 1939), artist
Carlos Manuel de Céspedes (1819–1874), revolutionary
Perucho Figueredo (1818–1870), composer of the Cuban national anthem
Pablo Milanés (1943-2022), singer
Tomás Estrada Palma (1832–1908), first president of Cuba
Felo Ramírez (1923-2017), radio presenter
Rolando Uríos (born 1971), handball player
Alexis Pantoja Perez (born 1969), painter
Sigmund Sobolewski (1923–2017), Polish Holocaust survivor
Sergio Pérez Barrero (Born 1953), Psychiatrist.

See also

La Bayamesa, Cuban national anthem

References

External links

 
Cities in Cuba
Populated places in Granma Province
Populated places established in 1513
1510s establishments in the Spanish West Indies
1510s in Cuba
1827 establishments in the Spanish Empire
1820s in Cuba